Chap hop is music originating from England that mixes the hip hop genre with elements from the Chappist or steampunk subcultures and stereotypical English obsessions such as cricket, tea, and the weather.

Two leading exponents of the genre are Professor Elemental and Mr.B The Gentleman Rhymer. Other names include Madam Misfit, Poplock Holmes & DJ WattsOn.

In 2011, Sir Reginald Pikedevant, Esquire, inspired by Regretsy's "Not Remotely Steampunk" section, released the music video "Just Glue Some Gears On It (And Call It Steampunk)" on YouTube, which quickly went viral and as of 2021 has generated over one million views. It was named one of the top ten steampunk songs and was acclaimed by steampunk notables.

In March 2013, UK Education Secretary Michael Gove said he was a fan of the genre. Mr. B noted the irony of this, since his music often pokes at members of the establishment, commenting: "As a non-Etonian and thus an outcast within the cabinet, this is perhaps a little snook cocked at his colleagues."

See also 
 British hip hop
 The Chap
 Steampunk

References

External links 
 Steampunks gather for Great Exhibition
 Chap-Hop Rivalry reaches New Heights

British hip hop genres
English styles of music
21st-century music genres
Hip hop genres
Steampunk music